Gervais or Gervase is a name. Notable people with the name include:

Given name
 Gervais, Count of Rethel (fl. 11th century), French archbishop and nobleman
 Gervais Batota (born 1982), Congolese footballer 
 Gervais Baudouin (c. 1645 – 1700), French physician
 Gervais de Château-du-Loir (1007–1067), French nobleman and bishop
 Gervais Djondo (born c. 1934), Togolese entrepreneur
 Gervais Emmanuel Ducasse (1903–1988), Haitian painter
 Gervais Gindre (born 1927), French cross country skier and Olympic competitor
 Gervais Henrie, Seychellois politician
 Gervais de La Rue (1751–1835), French historian
 Gervais Martel (born 1954), French businessman and football club president
 Gervais de Melkley (c. 1185, fl. 1200–1219), French scholar and poet
 Gervais Nolan (1796–1857), Canadian fur trapper 
 Gervais Parker (1695–1750), British Army officer
 Gervase Phinn (born 1946), English author and educator
 Gervais Randrianarisoa (born 1984), Malagasy footballer
 Gervais Rentoul (1884–1946), British politician
 Gervais Rufyikiri (born 1965), Burundian politician
 Sir Gervais Tennyson d'Eyncourt, 2nd Baronet (1902–1971), English baronet
 Gervais Waye-Hive (born 1988), Seychellois soccer player
 Gervinho, Ivorian footballer Gervais Yao Kouassi (born 1987)

Surname
 Aaron Gervais (born 1980), Canadian composer
 Bruno Gervais (born 1984), Canadian ice hockey player
 Cedric Gervais (born 1979), American DJ and house music producer
 Charles-Hubert Gervais (1671–1744), French composer
 Drago Gervais (1904–1957), Croatian poet
 Gaétan Gervais (1944–2018), Canadian writer, historian and flag designer
 Jean-Loup Gervais(1936-) French physicist
 Joseph Gervais (1777–1861), Oregon pioneer
 John Gervais (13th century), Bishop of Winchester
 John Lewis Gervais (1741–1798), South Carolina statesman
 Leslie-Ann Gervais (born 1977), Canadian fencer
 Marc Gervais (1929–2012), Canadian Jesuit and film professor
 Paul Gervais (1816–1879), French palaeontologist and entomologist
 Paul Gervais (painter) (1859–1944), French painter
 Paul Gervais (writer) (born 1946), American novelist and garden-designer
 Paul Mullins Gervais (1925–1997), Liberal party member of the Canadian House of Commons
 Ricky Gervais (born 1961), English comedian and actor
 Virginie Gervais (born 1979), French model and porn star

See also
 Gervais (disambiguation)
 Gervaise (disambiguation)
 Gervase (disambiguation)

Surnames of French origin